Lomba is a civil parish in the municipality of Lajes das Flores on the island of Flores in the Portuguese archipelago of the Azores.

History
The religious parish, since 1698, was established to the invocation of Saint Cajetan of Thiene, at the time a population of 750 residents (during the 19th century).

Geography
The civil parish is located on the east-southeast coast of the island, and confined by the parishes Fazenda (to the south) and Caveira (in the north), approximately 5 kilometers from the municipal seat, along the margins of Ribeira da Silva on the border of the municipality. Its taxonomy was derived from its location; Lomba was located on a high precipice over the ocean, delimited by valleys on either side (lomba is the Portuguese term for hill), and was once called Lomba da Boa Vista.

Architecture

Civic
 Agricultural sheds Rua do Cabeço
 Fountain of Lomba
 Hayloft of Quateiro
 Port of Lomba
 Residence of Maurício Vieira
 Residence Rua da Terra Chã

Religious
 Church of São Caetano, the parochial church dates to 1698, but the current structure was constructed during the 18th century, based on a common three-register structure prevalent in the region, that includes a steeple/belfry.
 Funeral Monumento
 Império of the Divine Holy Spirit of Lomba

References

Freguesias of Lajes das Flores